I Am a Sailor of the Black Sea Fleet, is a 1944 Soviet drama film directed by Aleksander Macheret and Vladimir Braun.

Plot 
The film tells about the hereditary Black Sea, Stepan Polosukhin, going to the fleet. At the beginning of the Great Patriotic War, he receives the first task - to scout the firing points of the enemy, which he successfully manages and he begins to fight the fascists on the Black Sea coast.

Starring 
 Boris Andreyev as Stepan Polosukhin and His father Grigoriy Polosukhin
 Larisa Yemelyantseva as Vera
 Andrei Sova as Boatswain
 Fyodor Ishchenko as Cutter commander
 B. Goloskov as Signalman
 Vladimir Vyazemskiy as Fyodor Ignatyevich, a partisan
 Vladimir Gribkov as Vasiliy Karpovich, a partisan
 Anatoliy Smiranin as German major
 Hans Klering as German lieutenant
 Georgiy Kurovskiy as Krotov

References

External links 
 

1944 films
1940s Russian-language films
Soviet war drama films
1940s war drama films
Soviet black-and-white films
1944 drama films